Andriy Oleksandrovych Zakharov (born 22 December 1968) is a Ukrainian retired footballer.

Career
He started his career in 1993 with Vorskla Poltava in the Ukrainian First League. In 1994 he moved to Vodnik Kherson where he played 4 matches. In 1995 he moved to Desna Chernihiv in the Ukrainian Second League. In 1996 he moved to Fakel Varva in the city of Varva which was playing in Chernihiv Oblast Football Championship but he didn't play a single match. In the same season he moved to Dzharylhach Skadovsk without playing and then he ended his career.

References

External links 
 Andrey Zakharov at footballfacts.ru

1968 births
Living people
Footballers from Chernihiv
FC Vorskla Poltava players
FC Desna Chernihiv players
FC Fakel Varva players
Ukrainian footballers
Ukrainian Premier League players
Ukrainian First League players
Ukrainian Second League players
Association football defenders